Annie Oakley is a 1935 American Western film directed by George Stevens and starring Barbara Stanwyck, Preston Foster, Melvyn Douglas and Moroni Olsen. The film is based on the life of Annie Oakley.

Plot
In late 1800s, Annie Oakley, a young woman from the Ohio backwoods, delivers six dozen quail that she has shot to the owner of the general store. He sends them to the MacIvor Hotel in Cincinnati, where the mayor is holding a large banquet in honor of Toby Walker, the "greatest shot in the whole world." Toby is particular about what he eats, and hotel owner James MacIvor bought Annie's quail because she shoots the quail cleanly through the head, leaving no buckshot elsewhere.

At the banquet, Jeff Hogarth signs Toby to a contract, making him part of the Buffalo Bill's Wild West show. James challenges Toby to a shooting contest to take place the next morning. James arranges for "Andy" Oakley to compete against Walker, only to be shocked when Annie appears. The match ends in a draw, so they proceed to sudden death. The two sharpshooters continue hitting their targets. Following a comment from her mother, Annie deliberately misses her next shot. Walker is a gracious, though unsuspecting winner; Hogarth knows exactly what happened.

When the Oakleys return home, Annie promises to reimburse all those who had bet on her. Jeff follows and tells Annie that he never bet the money that she had given him. He also invites her to join the Wild West show. Annie, having developed a crush on Toby, accepts. Jeff introduces her to Buffalo Bill and the other members of the show.

When Toby overhears Buffalo Bill telling Jeff that he might have to fire Annie because she lacks showmanship, he teaches her some shooting tricks.

At the first show, Sitting Bull is in the audience. Ned Buntline, Buffalo Bill's publicist, tries to enlist Sitting Bull for the show, but Sitting Bull is bored with the acts until he sees Annie shoot five targets thrown in the air. He is impressed and changes his mind to join the show.

A romance blossoms between Annie and Toby despite Jeff's attempts to win her affections. They also become good friends with Sitting Bull.

One day, a man with a grudge tries to shoot Sitting Bull. Toby grabs the man's gun just as it fires, saving Sitting Bull's life although his eyes are affected by the closeness of the shot. While Annie's fortunes rise, Toby's decline. He hides his injury but accidentally shoots Annie in the hand and is dismissed from the show. Annie is heartbroken but Jeff and Wild Bill try to keep Toby away from her. However, during a chance meeting, Annie is told by a woman accompanying Toby that she has only brought bad luck to Toby. Although Toby tries to stop the woman, Annie feels that what she says is true and unhappily retreats. After a triumphant tour of Europe, the show plays in New York City, where Sitting Bull spots Toby and reunites him with Annie.

Cast

 Barbara Stanwyck as Annie Oakley 
 Preston Foster as Toby Walker
 Melvyn Douglas as Jeff Hogarth
 Moroni Olsen as Col. William F. "Buffalo Bill" Cody
 Pert Kelton as Vera Delmar
 Andy Clyde as James MacIvor
 Chief Thunderbird as Sitting Bull  
 Dick Elliott as Major Ned Buntline (uncredited)
 Theodore Lorch as Wild West Show Announcer (uncredited)
 Margaret Armstrong as Mrs. Oakley
 Delmar Watson as Wesley Oakley
 Adeline Craig as Susan Oakley
 Richard Alexander as Crown Prince Wilhelm (uncredited)
 Brandon Hurst as Doctor (uncredited)
 Philo McCullough as Officer (uncredited)
 Robert McKenzie as Sheriff Bixby (uncredited)
 Blue Washington as Cook (uncredited)

Production
The film was the first Western for both Stevens and Stanwyck. While based on the real life of Annie Oakley, it took some liberties with the historical details. The film focuses primarily on Oakley's love affair with Toby Walker (representing Oakley's real-life husband Frank E. Butler) rather than on her career as an exhibition sharpshooter. It also does not depict how Butler, himself a skilled marksman, willingly ceded the spotlight to Oakley in the Wild West shows. Several of the film's scenes, such as those in which Oakley deliberately loses a shooting match and Oakley and Walker are reunited by Sitting Bull, were likely concocted to appeal to contemporary audience tastes and expectations.

The working title for the film was "Shooting Star."

Reception
The film was released less than ten years after the death of the real-life Oakley. It returned a profit of $48,000.

Andre Sennwald of The New York Times called the film a "gaudy and pungent motion picture, smacking healthily of that obscure commodity known as tanbark" and wrote: "Barbara Stanwyck is splendid in the title role; this is her most striking performance in a long time. Preston Foster plays persuasively, too, in the unrealized Toby Walker role, and Moroni Olsen is excellently bluff as Buffalo Bill. Chief Thunderbird, though, is the star of the picture. One scene, by the way, ought to give you a start. That is when the Kaiser, then only a Prince, gallantly holds a cigarette in his mouth for Annie to shoot at. What might have been the course of history, you find yourself wondering, if Annie had missed."

Decades later, Pauline Kael called Stanwyck "consistently fresh and believable" and wrote that Stevens "makes some of the points about race he made later in Giant... but here they're lighter and better. They seem to grow casually out of the American material; the movie feels almost improvised."

References

External links

 
 
 
 

1935 films
1935 Western (genre) films
1930s American films
1930s biographical films
1930s historical romance films
American biographical films
American black-and-white films
American historical romance films
American Western (genre) films
Films about Wild West shows
Films directed by George Stevens
Films produced by Cliff Reid
Films set in the 1880s
Films set in Ohio
RKO Pictures films
Cultural depictions of Annie Oakley
Cultural depictions of Buffalo Bill

ca:Annie Oakley